The Weller brothers, Englishmen of Sydney, Australia, and Otago, New Zealand, were the founders of a whaling station on Otago Harbour and New Zealand's most substantial merchant traders in the 1830s.

Immigration
The brothers, Joseph Brooks (1802–1835), George (1805–1875) and Edward (1814–1893), founded their establishment at Otago Heads in 1831, the first enduring European settlement in what is now the City of Dunedin.

Members of a wealthy land-owning family from Folkestone, Kent, they moved serially to Australia, partly to alleviate Joseph Brooks Weller's tuberculosis. Joseph Brooks left England on 20 October 1823. He arrived in Hobart on 4 February 1824 and then went to Sydney. After 18 months he returned to England, and left there for good on 1 January 1827 accompanied by Edward. In the meantime George had already left England and arrived in Australia in March 1826, and had bought the Albion. By 1830 Joseph Brooks, Edward, George and his new wife, Elizabeth (formerly Barwise), their parents, Joseph (1766–1857) and Mary (née Brooks) (b.1779), and two sisters, Fanny (1812–1896) and Ann (1822–1887), were all in Sydney.

Development of trading

Joseph Brooks Weller interested himself in flax and timber trading at the Hokianga. In 1831 he called at William Cook's shipbuilding settlement at Stewart Island/Rakiura to commission a vessel before visiting Otago in the Sir George Murray, reaching an agreement with Tahatu and claiming territory for William IV. He returned in the Lucy Ann with goods and gear to establish a whaling station, (it is believed with Edward) in November. George and his wife came too, or arrived soon after.

The Wellers continued to trade in flax and spars, maintaining operations at the Hokianga even as they developed Otago. At that time and throughout the decade they were the only merchants regularly trading from one end of New Zealand to the other. A fire soon destroyed the Otago station, but it was rebuilt. Edward was kidnapped by Māori in the far north and ransomed. Whale products started flowing from Otago in 1833 where Joseph Brooks based himself and European women went to settle.

Relations with Maori were often tense, the establishment being ransacked and the Wellers keeping Māori hostages in Sydney, reverberations from earlier conflicts (Sealers' War). Joseph Brooks died at Otago in 1835, and his brother Edward shipped his remains to Sydney in a puncheon of rum.

At 21 Edward became the resident manager while George maintained the Sydney end of the business. At this time there were 80 Europeans at Otago which had become a trading, transshipment and ship service centre as well as a whaling station. A measles epidemic greatly reduced the Māori population.

Further developments
New fisheries were established inside the harbour and up and down the coast. The Wellers' ships sailed beyond Australasia and they tested the tax regime preventing direct shipment of whale products to Britain.

Edward made strategic marriages to a daughter of Tahatu, Paparu, and after her death to Taiaroa’s daughter, Nikuru. There were daughters, Fanny and Nani, by each alliance.

By the end of the 1830s, exports of whale products (southern right or humpback whales) were at a peak, the station taking about 300 southern right whales on the first season, as was the resident European population. Anticipating British annexation the Wellers started buying land and settling it. But a sudden decline in whales saw Edward's exit at the end of 1840 followed by the firm’s bankruptcy. He and George lived out their lives in New South Wales. The management of Otakou whaling operations was taken over in 1840 by Charles Schultze (1818–1879), who had married the Weller brothers' sister Ann Weller, and an employee, Octavius Harwood (1816–1900).

The settlement of Otago reached a nadir in 1842 but ultimately revived, remaining the centre of port operations in the area until after the establishment of Port Chalmers and Dunedin. As "Otakou" it is now a suburb within the boundaries of Dunedin.

Weller's Rock, also known as Te Umu Kuri, near Harington Point on the Otago Peninsula (at ), is named after the Weller brothers. In January 2020 Te Runanga o Otakou, the Dunedin City Council and the Department of Conservation joined forces in a project to protect the site from degradation.

Folklore
"Wellerman" is a sea shanty that refers to the wellermen, the supply ships owned by the trading company set up by the Weller Brothers. The song was originally collected around 1966 by the New Zealand-based music teacher and folk song compiler, Neil Colquhoun. The song has been performed and remixed, with over ten recorded renditions between 1967 and 2005, including by British band The Longest Johns in 2018 and Scottish singer Nathan Evans in 2020.

Notes

References

[https://teara.govt.nz/en/1966/weller-brothers-edward-george-and-joseph The Weller Brothers] in the 1966 Encyclopaedia of New Zealand
Entwisle, P. in Griffiths G. (ed) (1974) The Advance Guard Series 3 Edward Weller Dunedin, NZ: Otago Daily Times.
Entwisle, P. (1998) Behold the Moon the European Occupation of the Dunedin District 1770–1848 Dunedin, NZ: Port Daniel Press. .

People from Otago Peninsula
Settlers of Otago
History of Dunedin
New Zealand people in whaling
1831 establishments in New Zealand
Australian people in whaling
Australian ship owners
Ellison family
19th century in Dunedin